The Cheyenne Social Club is a 1970 American Western comedy film written by James Lee Barrett, directed and produced by Gene Kelly, and starring James Stewart, Henry Fonda and Shirley Jones. The film is about an aging cowboy who inherits a brothel and decides to turn it into a respectable boarding house, against the wishes of both the townspeople and the ladies working there.

Plot
In 1867, John O'Hanlan and Harley Sullivan are aging cowboys working on open cattle ranges in Texas. John gets a letter from an attorney in Cheyenne, Wyoming that his brother, D.J., left him The Cheyenne Social Club in his will. After making the trek to Cheyenne, John and Harley learn The Cheyenne Social Club is a high-class brothel next to the railroad. John falls into disfavor with both the Club's ladies and the men in Cheyenne when he decides to close the Club. John learns his brother's deed had a provision the property would revert to the railroad if the ladies moved. Jenny, the Club's madam, is assaulted by a man named Bannister. John kills Bannister and regains popularity. Bannister's relatives come to Cheyenne for revenge, but John, Harley and Jenny successfully fight them off. When advised that even more of the Bannisters' relatives will soon come to town, John transfers ownership of the property to Jenny and he and Harley return to Texas.

Cast
 James Stewart as John O'Hanlan
 Henry Fonda as Harley Sullivan
 Shirley Jones as Jenny
 Sue Ane Langdon as Opal Ann
 Elaine Devry as Pauline
 Jackie Russell as Carrie Virginia
 Jackie Joseph as Annie Jo
 Sharon DeBord as Sara Jean
 Robert Middleton as Barkeep
 Robert J. Wilke as Corey Bannister
 Dabbs Greer as Jedediah W. Willowby
 John Dehner as Clay Carroll (uncredited)

Production
Set in a brothel with suggestive dialogue, this was one of the few off-color films that James Stewart did. He also specifically asked that his friend Fonda be cast; they had most recently worked together two years previously in Firecreek. Stewart and Fonda's first film together had been the musical comedy On Our Merry Way (1948), and they had also both appeared in How the West Was Won (1962) but had no scenes together despite playing best friends.

The exteriors were shot at two Western film lots near Santa Fe, New Mexico: the Eaves Movie Ranch, which was built for the film, and Bonanza Creek Ranch. The interiors were shot at the Samuel Goldwyn Studios in Hollywood.

A novelisation of the screenplay was written by Phillip Rock.

Release
The film had its world premiere in Salt Lake City on June 10, 1970. It also opened in Provo and Ogden, Utah and Boise, Idaho before expanding into Des Moines and Waterloo, Iowa and Omaha, Nebraska as well as Montana.

Home Media
The film is currently distributed by Warner Home Video, with a German DVD release in 2019 by 375 Media.

Reception
The Cheyenne Social Club turned a small profit but was poorly received by critics. It didn't receive any notoriety until decades later with numerous cable television broadcasts. Barrett's script earned a 1970 Writers Guild of America nomination for "Best Comedy Written Directly for the Screen", but lost to Neil Simon for The Out-of-Towners.

In its first five days in 15 theaters in Utah, Idaho, Iowa and Nebraska it grossed $108,622.

See also
 List of American films of 1970

References

External links 
 
 
 
 

1970 films
1970s English-language films
1970s Western (genre) comedy films
American Western (genre) comedy films
Films about prostitution in the United States
Films directed by Gene Kelly
Films scored by Walter Scharf
Films set in Wyoming
Films shot in Los Angeles
Films shot in New Mexico
Cinema Center Films films
Films set in 1867
1970s historical comedy films
American historical comedy films
1970 comedy films
1970s American films